Gaius Sulpicius Galba (died 36) was a Roman senator who was active during the reign of Tiberius. He was consul in AD 22 as the colleague of Decimus Haterius Agrippa. Sulpicius Galba was the son of Gaius Sulpicius Galba and Mummia Achaica, granddaughter of Quintus Lutatius Catulus; the future emperor Galba was his brother.

Over his lifetime Gaius squandered the larger portion of his estate, and was forced to retire from Rome. He hoped to recover his wealth through the sortition of 36, which had given him either Africa or Asia to govern as proconsul, but the emperor Tiberius forbade him from taking up the province awarded him. This forced Gaius to end his life.

References 

36 deaths
1st-century Romans
Ancient Romans who committed suicide
Imperial Roman consuls
Galba, Gaius
Galba
Year of birth unknown